The North Hollywood–Pasadena Transit Corridor is a proposed  bus rapid transit line in the Metro Busway network in Los Angeles, California. It is planned to operate between Pasadena and the North Hollywood Metro Station in the San Fernando Valley where it will connect with the Metro B Line on the Metro Rail system and the G Line Metro Busway. The project completed its scoping phase in 2019, was approved by the Metro board on April 28, 2022 and is estimated to be completed by 2024. It is part of Metro's Twenty-eight by '28 initiative.

No current Metro Rail conversion plans are scheduled, although the city of Glendale is proposing a street car service in their downtown, connecting the region with "last mile/first mile" service.

The east to west/west to east route will have signal priority at traffic lights and will have exclusive lanes for most of the route. Metro reports the cost is $448 million. Metro received comments it would have to accommodate the annual Rose Parade route on Colorado boulevard. Destinations along the route include Old Pasadena, The Paseo, and Pasadena City College and  Americana at Brand outdoor mall. It would also connect with Warner Bros. Studios, Walt Disney Studios, The Burbank Studios, Downtown Burbank Station and Universal Studios.

In November 2020, Metro launched the details of the route, its stops, where the lanes reside, and whether or not they are exclusive or in mixed traffic. Public comments were open until December 10, 2020. In April 2022, Metro approved the Environmental Impact Report for the line, but was later sued in July 2022 as the meeting where the EIR was approved violated California's Ralph M. Brown Act, and may result in the approval being voided.

Initial Alternative Analysis
The bus route is planned to connect L.A.'s San Fernando Valley communities of Burbank, North Hollywood and Glendale with San Gabriel Valley community of Pasadena thru Eagle Rock. A mostly street option, an all freeway option on SR 134 freeway, or a hybrid of both. Metro’s Board of Directors approved advancing a mostly street-running route with some variations for more study as part of the project’s Draft Environmental Impact Report (DEIR). Community meetings took place for Metro to weigh routes environmental issues and any other issue that could be address during the DEIR until the end of 2019.

Pasadena/Eagle Rock
In the east portion, the route begins between Del Mar station and Memorial Park station on the L Line. Heads west along Colorado Boulevard to Eagle Rock. Metro proposes multiple options on how it passes Eagle Rock. West thru Wilson Avenue, or west on Colorado St. Metro recently added a third route for the DEIR, a SR 134 freeway median route as it heads into Glendale.
Glendale/Burbank
After Eagle Rock, it will enter Glendale on Broadway or Colorado St and head north for a mile on Central or Brand Avenue thru downtown Glendale before heading west on Glenoaks Boulevard into Burbank. The route makes a southwest turn on Olive Avenue. The same intersection where the downtown Burbank Metrolink station is located.
North Hollywood
Leaving the Metrolink station in Burbank, Metro's main option has it heading west on Olive Avenue and Riverside Drive until reaching Lankershim Boulevard and the B Line's North Hollywood station. Other North Hollywood routes optioned from the Burbank Metrolink station are west on Chandler Boulevard, or Magnolia Boulevard with the same terminus. All are under the technical study for possible DEIR.

 Results

The final Alternatives Analysis projected street running ridership to reach approximately 29,750 daily riders by 2042 versus 23,136 daily riders for a free-way running option.

Alternatives
Metro Express 501 began operation in 2016 between North Hollywood Metro station and a stop near Pasadena Del Mar station.

Proposed Station list
In April 2021, Metro presented a community update sheet which narrowed the list of alternatives down to one route based on community feedback. Significant changes to the preferred alternative included a re-routing from Olive Avenue in Burbank onto Alameda Avenue and Buena Vista Street, while consolidating the two nearby proposed stations into one on Alameda and Naomi Street, as well as the elimination of the station connection to the Downtown Burbank station due to safety concerns regarding the existing Olive Avenue bridge. In its place, a station was added nearby to Lake Street.

References

External links
Project website

Los Angeles Metro Busway projects
 Metro Rapid
Metro Rapid
 Metro Rapid
Proposed railway lines in California
Transportation in Los Angeles
Transportation in the San Fernando Valley
2024 in transport